Blanche McManus (1869–1935) was an American writer and artist. She and her husband, Milburg Francisco Mansfield wrote a series of illustrated travel books, many of which included information about automobiles which were new at the time.

Biography
McManus was born on Talledega Plantation, East Feliciana Parish, Louisiana, in 1870 and died in Louisiana on June 13, 1935.

McManus inherited Hampton Hall, a historic mansion in Woodville, Mississippi, with her two sisters in 1909. She did the murals in the parlor.

Collections
Her work is included in the collection of the Smithsonian American Art Museum.

Books written/illustrated
Many of these books may have only been cover design illustrations by Blanche McManus.

References

External links
 
 
 
 
 McManus biography
 

1869 births
1935 deaths
19th-century American novelists
19th-century American women writers
20th-century American novelists
20th-century American women writers
American children's writers
American women children's writers
American women illustrators
American illustrators
American women novelists
People from East Feliciana Parish, Louisiana